This is a list of nations that have participated in the Maccabiah from the 1st Maccabiah to the 19th Maccabiah. As of the 19th Games, 110 nations have participated in at least one edition of the Maccabiah. The United States, the United Kingdom, Switzerland, Denmark, Austria, and France have competed in all nineteen Maccabiot.

History 

The first Maccabiah which was held on March 28, 1932, included 390 athletes from 18 countries. The second Maccabiah, which was held on April 2, 1935, increased the number of participating nations to 28 with over 1350 athletes. The two games included Arab nations such as Egypt, Syria, and Lebanon. The third Maccabiah, which was scheduled for spring of 38, was postponed until 1950, after the establishment of the state of Israel. Attendance for the third Maccabiah were considerably less than the previous two with only 20 nations due to various economical and political reasons.

The attended at the Maccabiah have slowly increased over the next three decade. surpassing 30 nations and close to 3,500 athletes in the 11th Maccabiah. By the 19th Maccabiah, which took place in 2013, the numbers have grown to 9,000 Jewish athletes from 76 nations.

List of nations

Description 
The list below includes all nations that have participated in at least one event in the Maccabiah, arranged alphabetically.

Several nations have changed during their Maccabiah history. Name changes due to geographical renaming are explained by footnotes after the nation's name, and other changes are explained by footnotes linked within the table itself. A select number of obsolete nations are also included in the table to more clearly illustrate past Maccabiah appearances for their successor nations:

Table legend

Alphabetical list

See also 
 List of participating nations at the Winter Olympic Games
 List of participating nations at the Summer Olympic Games

Notes

References 

 
 

Nations